Un solo corazón (English title:A single heart) is a Mexican telenovela produced by Patricia Lozano and directed by Tony Carbajal for Televisa in 1983. It starred Julieta Rosen, Daniel Martin, Beatriz Sheridan, Raymundo Capetillo, and Liliana Abud.

Cast 
Julieta Rosen as Julieta
Daniel Martin as Tomas
Beatriz Sheridan as Pilar
Germán Robles as Juez
Raymundo Capetillo as Roberto
Liliana Abud as Maria
Yamil Atala as Carlos
Lilia Aragón as Graciela
Miguel Córcega as Alfonso
Lili Inclán as Grandmother
Patricia Davalos as Mariana
Carmen Delgado as Catalina
Sergio Acosta as Salvador
José Roberto as Mauricio
Francoise Gilbert as Ingrid
Luz María Peña as Ada
Otto Sirgo as Oscar Padilla
Lucía Guilmáin as Amelia
Guillermo Zarur as Raul
Lourdes Munguía as Helena
Cynthia Riveroll as Alicia
Erik Estrada as Luis

References

External links

Mexican telenovelas
1983 telenovelas
1983 Mexican television series debuts
1983 Mexican television series endings
Spanish-language telenovelas
Televisa telenovelas